The English Seniors Open was a European Senior Tour men's professional golf tournament. It was first played in 2003 and each of the first three stagings were won by Carl Mason. In 2007 the prize fund was £150,000 and the host course was St Mellion in Cornwall. After a five-year break, the tournament returned in 2013 and 2014 at Rockliffe Hall in County Durham, with a £200,000 purse and a £30,000 first prize.

Winners

External links
Coverage on the European Senior Tour's official site

Former European Senior Tour events
Golf tournaments in England
Recurring sporting events established in 2003
Recurring sporting events disestablished in 2014
2003 establishments in England
2014 disestablishments in England
Defunct sports competitions in England